Bruce Halliday may refer to:

Bruce Halliday (footballer) (born 1961), English former footballer
Bruce Halliday (politician) (1926–2011), Canadian physician and federal politician